Henri Elendé (13 November 1941 – 23 June 2022) was a Congolese athlete. He competed in the men's high jump at the 1964 Summer Olympics. With Leon Yombe, Elende made up the first team from the Republic of the Congo to participate in the Olympic Games.

Achievements

References

External links
 

1941 births
2022 deaths
Athletes (track and field) at the 1964 Summer Olympics
Republic of the Congo male high jumpers
Olympic athletes of the Republic of the Congo
Place of birth missing
African Games medalists in athletics (track and field)
African Games silver medalists for the Republic of the Congo
Athletes (track and field) at the 1965 All-Africa Games